Seo Ji-hoon or Seo Ji-hun is a Korean name consisting of the family name Seo and the masculine given name Ji-hoon, and may refer to:

 Seo Ji-hun (gamer) (born 1985), South Korean video game player
 Seo Ji-hoon (actor) (born 1997), South Korean actor